TGR (Italian: TG Regione) is the brand for Italian state-owned public broadcasting company Rai's regional news programmes. They are broadcast domestically on Rai Tre and Rai Radio 1. It was launched in 1979 as TG3 Regione, and was known as Rai Regione from 1987-1992 before adopting the current TGR name from 1992-1999 (when its name was changed to TG3 Regione again) and again from 2002 onwards. Today with about 800 journalists is Europe's largest broadcast news organisation..

Programme format
The programme is generally presented by a single newsreader with additional newsreaders for the sports news. Most items are made up of reports and are generally preceded and followed by the correspondent reporting live from the scene of the report. It is a local news bulletin: the news only concerns the region to which the edition belongs (21 editions for 20 regions: for the Trentino-Alto Adige region two different news programs are broadcast, TGR Trento for the Trentino area and TGR Bolzano for the Alto Adige area) and the program only airs in the relevant region through Rai 3 channel. The programme airs at 14:00 and at 19:30 and lasts 20 minutes. There is also a third edition, shorter, lasting about five minutes, called "Edizione della notte" (night time edition) that airs at around 23:30 but sometime a bit later. The programme is followed by a weather report known as Meteo.

Daily programme
Rai also produces other programmes with TGR brand, for a local or national audience

National programmes

Regional Programmes

History 
TGR Piazza Affari launched it new opening on 7 July 2015 which was then later of TGR Regional newscast a little bit later on 21 July 2015 of most of them while some kept the same original opening which has a different sound when switching to a different opening of the newscast. Most of the news station set were changed mostly in August. TGR Buongirono Italia had a new graphics since it started airing Fall 2015.

Editors
1979 Biagio Agnes
1987 Piervincenzo Porcacchia
1990 Leonardo Valente
1993 Barbara Scaramucci
1994 Piero Vigorelli
1996 Nino Rizzo Nervo
1997 Ennio Chiodi
2000 Nino Rizzo Nervo
2001 Antonio Di Bella
2002 Angela Buttiglione
2009 Alberto Maccari
2012 Alessandro Casarin
2013 Vincenzo Morgante
2018 Alessandro Casarin

Presenters

TGR Piazza Affari
From Monday to Friday at 15:10. Presenters:
 Michela Coricelli
 Paolo Gila 
 Sabrina Manfroi
 Fabrizio Patti
 Marzio Quaglino
 Chiara Rancati

TGR Buongiorno Italia 
From Monday to Friday at 6:59am. Presenters:

 from Milan for the Central Northern Italy: Maria Chiara Grandis, Anna Madia (one week a month from TGR Marche), Maria Rosa Monaco and Luigina Venturelli (one week a month from TGR Bolzano)
 from Naples for the Central Southern Italy; Lorenzo Bertolucci (one week a month from TGR Calabria), Simona Desole (one week a month from TGR Sardegna), Diego Dionoro and Marcella Maresca

TGR Buongiorno Regione 
From Monday to Friday at 7:30am. Presenters:

 Abruzzo: Alice Cercone, Roberta Mancinelli.
 Basilicata: Ines Siano, Igor Uboldi.
 Calabria: Livia Blasi, Gabriella D’Atri, Marco Innocente Furina, Mara Martelli, Ilaria Raffaele.
 Campania: Claudia Bruno, Diego Dionoro, Marcella Maresca.
 Emilia Romagna: David Marceddu, Virginia Novellini, Francesca Romanelli, Francesco Satta, Lucia Voltan.
 Friuli Venezia Giulia: Eva Ciuk, Nada Čok, Lorenzo Gherlinzoni, Livia Liberatore, Andrea Saule, Francesca Terranova, Anna Vitaliani
 Lazio: Rosario Carello.
 Lombardia: Maria Chiara Grandis, Maria Rosa Monaco, Martino Villosio; newspaper reader: Giuditta Castellanza, Sara Grattoggi, Claudia Mondelli, Laura Troja.
 Piemonte: Marzia De Giuli, Fabio De Ponte, Ludovico Fontana, Noemi Romeo, Martino Villosio.

TG Regione ore 14:00
 Abruzzo: Monia Baldascino, Silvana Ferrante, Silvano Barone, Antimo Amore, Celeste Acquaffredda, Roberta Mancinelli
 Basilicata: Valentina Dello Russo, Manuela Mele
 Calabria: Mara Martelli, Maria Vittoria Morano
 Campania: Annalisa Angelone, Francesca Coppola, Anna Teresa Damiano, Antonella Fracchiolla, Rino Genovese
 Emilia Romagna: Giovanna Greco, Antonio Farnè, Mattia Martini, Ivana Delvino
 Friuli Venezia Giulia: Marinella Chirico, Eva Ciuk, Nada Čok, Andrea Covre, Lorenzo Gherlinzoni, Livia Liberatore, Francesca Terranova, Elisabetta Zaccolo, Alessandra Zigaina
 Lazio: Roberta Ammendola, Valeria Cucchiaroni, Eleonora Fioretti, Antonella Pallante, Virginia Polizzi
 Liguria: Michela Bellenzier, Enzo Melillo
 Lombardia: Paola Colombo, Roberta Di Matteo, Alessandra Farina, Alice Monni
 Marche: Francesca Piatanesi, Anna Francesca Mezzina, Annalisa Serpilli
 Molise: Marco Scoteroni
 Piemonte: Marzia De Giuli, Noemi Romeo, Roberto Rotondo, Elisabetta Terigi, Martino Villosio
 Puglia: Claudia Bruno
 Sardegna: Cristiana Aime, Elisabetta Atzeni, Elena Laudante, Rossella Romano
 Toscana: Gianluca Vatti
 Trentino Alto Adige:
 Umbria: Federcia Becchetti
 Valle d'Aosta: Elena Baiocco, Enrico Romagnoli
 Veneto: Roberto Bonaldi, Elena Chemello, Patrizia Giustarini, Sara Barovier, Stefania Bolzan, Lucia Cappelletti, Matteo Mohorovicich, Marco Marchesini, Ivana Godnik, Maria Pia Zorzi, Elisa Billato, Alessia Piovesan, Luca Ginetto, Barnaba Ungaro, Davide Calimani

TG Regione ore 19:35
 Abruzzo: Berardo Aurini, Monia Baldascino, Ezio Cerasi
 Basilicata: Cinzia Grenci, Grazia Napoli, Manuela Mele
 Calabria: Gabriella d'Atri, Marco Innocente Furina, Carla Monaco
 Campania: Letizia Cafiero, Luigi Carbone, Giuseppe De Caro
 Emilia Romagna: Matteo Merli
 Friuli Venezia Giulia: Marinella Chirico, Eva Ciuk, Nada Čok, Andrea Covre, Lorenzo Gherlinzoni, Livia Liberatore, Francesca Terranova, Elisabetta Zaccolo, Alessandra Zigaina
 Lazio: Francesco Rositano, Antonio Scoppettuolo, Francesco Trapanotto
 Liguria: Giorgio Giglioli
 Lombardia: Michela Coricelli, Camilla Manconi, Maria Rosa Monaco, Federico Simonelli
 Marche: Francesca Piatanesi, Anna Francesca Mezzina, Annalisa Serpilli
 Molise: Marco Scoteroni
 Piemonte: Federica Burbatti, Vanni Caratto, Maura Fassio, Matteo Spicuglia
 Puglia: Claudia Bruno
 Sardegna: Damiano Beltrami, Maria Spigonardo
 Toscana: Gianluca Vatti
 Trentino Alto Adige:
 Umbria: Antonella Marietti
 Valle d'Aosta: Elena Baiocco, Enrico Romagnoli, Silvia Tagliaferri
 Veneto: Roberto Bonaldi, Elena Chemello, Patrizia Giustarini, Sara Barovier, Stefania Bolzan, Lucia Cappelletti, Matteo Mohorovicich, Marco Marchesini, Ivana Godnik, Maria Pia Zorzi, Elisa Billato, Alessia Piovesan, Luca Ginetto, Barnaba Ungaro, Davide Calimani

See also
Rai 3
TG3

References

External links
rainews.it/TGR 

Rai (broadcaster)
Italian television news shows
1979 Italian television series debuts
1987 Italian television series debuts
1970s Italian television series
1980s Italian television series
1990s Italian television series
2000s Italian television series
2010s Italian television series